Lower Deer Creek Valley Historic District is a national historic district near Darlington, Harford County, Maryland, United States. The primary building material is stone taken from local quarries and used to construct houses, mills, schoolhouses, and churches. Also constructed of stone are many dependencies including springhouses, stables, tenant houses, meathouses, ice houses, and barns. The district's contributing standing structures date from the mid 18th century to the 1940s, and mostly built in vernacular styles. The valley contains approximately 350 separate historic properties.

It was added to the National Register of Historic Places in 1993.

References

External links
, including photo dated 1992, at Maryland Historical Trust
Boundary Map of the Lower Deer Creek Valley Historic District, Harford County, at Maryland Historical Trust

Historic districts in Harford County, Maryland
Historic districts on the National Register of Historic Places in Maryland
National Register of Historic Places in Harford County, Maryland